World’s Toughest Race: Eco-Challenge Fiji is television series documenting a long-range multi-day expedition race in which teams race non-stop with little to no sleep over mountains, jungles, and oceans. The series is a revival of the Eco-Challenge series first broadcast from 1995 to 2002. The race took place in Fiji in September 2019, and the television series documenting the race hosted by Bear Grylls premiered on Amazon Prime Video on August 14, 2020.

The race was contested by 66 teams of four from around the world. The race encompassed trekking by foot and traveling in various non-motorized forms of transportation, including paddling and sailing in an outrigger, paddleboarding, mountain biking, and whitewater rafting, requiring skills such as rappelling, climbing, and canyoneering. No modern technology can be used in navigation, and only a map and compass were provided. Expedition problem-solving skills were required to meet any challenges the teams may encounter along the way. All members of a team must complete the race; should any team member quit or cannot complete the race, the entire team would be eliminated.

The race was won by Team New Zealand, who also won the previous race held 17 years prior. The winning team received a $100,000 cash prize.

Race course and overview
There were 31 checkpoints along the way split into 5 legs. Each of the first 4 legs finished at a camp where the team must rest for a mandatory 90 minutes. Teams must recover a medallion in each leg, and they must also finish each leg within a specified cut-off time or they will be eliminated. The five stages of the race course were:

They moved up the Waidalici River in Verata for 30 km on a stand-up paddleboard, before traveling on mountain bike for a  ride to Camp 1 at Naivucini Village, the end of the leg. Teams must reach the camp at 4pm on the third day.
Jungle leg – This leg covered almost  in three sections. First the teams traveled  through the Waiga Canyon where they may collect a medallion, then they paddled down  the Wainimala River on a self-made bamboo bilibili raft. They must reach Camp 2 at Waivaka village on day 5. 
For safety reason, no team can tackle white water rafting during the night, and teams must stay at the check point until dawn before they can proceed to the river to raft. They can collect a medallion from the chief of Namuamua Village after the rafting section. For the jungle-hiking, teams may enlist help from the locals as guides or porters. This leg ended at Camp 3 at Lutu Village. 
Highland leg – The teams first trekked through the jungle to the base of Vuwa Falls, and climbed 1,000 feet (300m) up the falls to collect a medallion.
Island leg – The last leg started with a  mountain bike ride, during which the teams needed to a rappel  down the Qalivuda Falls where they picked up their last medallion. After mountain biking, they transitioned to a stand-up paddleboard  down the Sabeto River to reach the ocean. From the Lomolomo Beach they changed to an outrigger for a  journey to their finishing line on Mana Island.
An early lead was taken by Team Bend Racing, but one member of the team suffered from heat exhaustion and the team dropped to the back of the pack to allow him to recover. Team New Zealand, consisting of team captain Nathan Fa’avae, Sophie Hart, Stuart Lynch, Chris Forne and Mark Rayward, then dominated the entire course. Other early leaders included Team Out There, Team France Expenature, Team Summit, Team Canada Adventure, Team Estonian Ace, Team Thunderbolt, and Team Tiki Tour, but along the way, navigational errors caused some of them to fall behind. The racers faced unexpected obstacles along the way, and heavy tropical storm forced the temporary suspension of the race for eight hours when water level rose to dangerous level in the canyon, although Team Estonian Ace was already trapped in the canyon. Parts of the course proved challenging for many teams and some, such as Team Summit, suffered from hypothermia after being immersed in the cold water for a long period in the mountain water. A number of teams were eliminated after failing to reach the camp before the cut-off time at each stage, the first to be eliminated this way was Team Unbroken. Others dropped out due to injury such as Team Onyx and Team Curl, or through illness caused by infections, while some dropped out through exhaustion due to the difficulty of the course.

The closing stages were contested between Team New Zealand, Team Canada Adventure and Team Gippsland Adventure from Australia. Although at some checkpoints the time differences between the leading and chasing teams were only minutes, Team New Zealand held on to their leading position throughout. Team New Zealand suffered a capsize of their outrigger requiring rescue in the last leg of the race; the organizers allowed them to continue the race after ferrying them to a nearby island and provided them with a new canoe. They managed to finish first, beating off challenges from the other two teams by over one-and-a-half hours.

Episodes

Teams
Each race team is composed of four competitors led by a team captain (TC), including at least one member of the opposite sex, with one additional team assistant crew member (TAC) who help their team when they reach the camp.  Each team races under a single country's flag. All teams must pass assessment tests on the various physical skills required on the course, and team members are required to work together under extreme stress and fatigue to finish the race. Listed below are the 66 competing teams:

Argentina
Team Outlab Argentina : Alejandro Eugenio Kuryluk (TC), Ignacio Raigoso, Silvina Bedecarras, Leonardo Yozzi, Fabian Cordiviola (TAC)
Team Tierra Viva : Guri Aznarez (TC), Veronica Astete, Juan Diego Lotz, Soledad Ermosilla, Dr. Marcelo Parada (TAC)

Australia
Team 2nd Chance : Deanna Blegg (TC), Maria Plyashechko, Sergey Kurov, Darren Clarke, Gavin Allen (TAC)
Team Aussie Rescue : Samantha Gash (TC), Morgan Coull, Mark Wales, Jarrod Mitchell, Joshua Lynott (TAC)
Team Gippsland Adventure : Rob Preston (TC), Kathryn Preston, Tim Boote, Aaron Prince, Patrick Howlett (TAC)
Team Mad Mayrs : Tyson Mayr (TC), Elijah Mayr, Nick Mayr, Courtney Home, Chris Dixon (TAC)
Team Scouts Australia : Myall Quint (TC), Marni Williams, Bernard Cronan, Benjamin (Ben) Warner, Brett Johnson (TAC)
Team Thunderbolt AR : Dave Schloss (TC), Bernadette Dornom, Elizabeth Dornom, Leo Theoharis, Jan Leverton (TAC)

Belgium
Team To-Get-Ther : Ludo Kaethoven (TC), Debby Urkens, Katrien Aerts, Jurgen Frtizz De Grauwe, Roger Urkens (TAC)

Brazil
Team Atenah Brasil : Shubi-Silvia Guimares (TC), Karina Bacha Lefevre, Nora Audre, Jose Caputo, Jose Pupo (TAC)
Team Vidaraid Adventure : Marco Amselem Rossini (TC), Urtzi Iglesias, Guilherme Pahl, Camila Nicolau, Aritz Bilbao Guerrero (TAC)

Canada
Team Atlas : Alexandre Provost (TC), Karine Corbell, Lars Bukkehave, Mark Sky, Tessa Jennison (TAC)
Team Canada Adventure : Bob Miller (TC), Ryan Atkins, Scott Ford, Rea Kolbl, Wayne Leek (TAC)
Team Peak Pursuit : Benjamin Kwiatkowski (TC), Thomas Hardy, Elora Van Jarrett, Jasper Edge, Laure Lejeune (TAC)
Team True North : Alex Mann (TC), Rebecca Mann, Philip Roadley, Logan Roadley, Jason Gillespie (TAC)

Colombia
Team Colombia : Jorge Diego Llano (TC), Jenny Sanin, Felix Vargas, Xavi Rodriguez Verdes, Jaroslav Najman (TAC)

Costa Rica
Team Costa Rica : Eduardo Baldioceda (TC), Sergio Sanchez, Gerhard Linner, Veronica Bravo, Eric Cano (TAC)

Czech Republic
Team Czech : Jan Cisar (TC), Pavel Paloncy, Tereza Rudolfova, Jan Obuskevic, Libor Kriz (TAC)

Ecuador
Team Epic Ecuador : Amber Laree de Freire (TC), Oswaldo (Ossy) Freire, Diana Artete, Pablo Sandoval, Paul Guerra (TAC)

Estonia
Team Estonian ACE : Silver Eensaar (TC), Timmo Tammemae, Reeda Tuula-Fjodorov, Rain Eensaar, Arthur Raichmann (TAC)

Fiji
Team Namako : Alivate Logavatu (TC), Petero Manoa, Eroni Takape, Kim Beckinsale, Courtney Nicole Kruse (TAC)
Team Tabu Soro : Uri Kurop (TC), Adam Wade, William Simpson, Anna Cowley, Semiti Tuitoga (TAC)

France
Team France Expenature : Romy “Romulad” Viale (TC), Daphne Derouch, Calais Jean Baptiste, Benjamin Midena, Philippe Marchegay (TAC)

Guatemala
Team Hombres D’Maiz : Netzer Quan (TC), Andres Duarte, Gabriela Molina, Sebastian Lancho, Leopoldo Bolanos (TAC)

India
Team Khukuri Warriors : Tashi Malik (TC), Nungshi Malik, Brandon Fisher, Praveen Singh Rangar, Col VS Malik (TAC)

Ireland
Team Ireland AR : Rob Heffernan (TC), Jason Black, Mark Lattanzi, Rachel Nolan, Ivan Park (TAC)

Israel
Team Israel : Elad Benjamin (TC), Daniel Keren, Ben Enosh, Linur Krigel Tsarfati, Amit Weiner (TAC)

Italy
Team Freemind Italia : Marco Ponteri (TC), Clelia Ponteri, Beppe Scotti, Telemaco Murgia, Tiziano Murgia (TAC)

Japan
Team East Wind : Masato Tanaka (TC), Machiko Nishii, Koki Yasuda, Akira Yonemoto, Masayuki Takahata (TAC)

Mexico
Team Teenek Mexico : Jorge Mendiola (TC), Ulises Gonzalez, Tomas Perez, Kathryn Morland, Fransico Mendiola (TAC)
Team Tollocan Mexico : Alejandro Carretero (TC), Yara Borbon, Fernando Villicana, Jorge Pavon, Adolfo Vela (TAC)

Netherlands
Team Checkpoint Hunters : Tom Oude Nijhuis (TC), Nienke Veenman, Wouter Neven, Rene Wolkorte, Tim Teutelink (TAC)

New Zealand
Team New Zealand : Nathan Fa’avae (TC), Sophie Hart, Stuart Lynch, Chris Forne, Mark Rayward (TAC)
Team Tiki Tour : Tom Lucas (TC), Micheal Kelly, Joanna Williams, George Lucas, Jeremy Warnock (TAC)

Russia
Team Science Winning : Eduard Khalilov (TC), Evgeniya Khalilov, Viktor Sherstiuk, Valeriy Cherkasov, Vyacheslav Obrazstov (TAC)

Spain
Team Meridianoraid Spain : Antonio de la Rosa Suarez (TC), Jesus Bermejo, Pablo Samper, Lucia Funes Mendez, Luis Cabrera (TAC)
Team Summit : Emma Roca (TC), Jukka Pinola, Fran Lopez Costoya, Albert Roca Velazquez, David Rovira Roqueta (TAC)

South Africa
Team Cyanosis : Clinton Mackintosh (TC), Nicholas Mulder, Sarah Fairmaid Clarke, Darren Barry, Steven Burnett (TAC)

Sweden
Team Swedeforce : John Karlsson (TC), Malin Hjalmarsson, Emil Dahlqvist, Oskar Svärd, Johan Lilja (TAC)

Turkey
Team Turk : Serdar KIlic (TC), Kenan Saran, Mike Saran, Eliska Hudcova, Andac Guven (TAC)

United Arab Emirates
Team Eco DXB : Emma Taylor (TC), Khalifa Algharfi, Ali Monguno, Ivana Kolaric, Peter Langley (TAC)

United Kingdom
Team UK Adventurers : Kevin Stephens (TC), Joseph Selby, Nathalie Long, Tim Stephens, Gill Watson (TAC)

United States
Team Able Abels : Dan Abel (TC), Ashley Abel, Lauren Abel, Fletcher Hammel, Allison Abel (TAC)
Team AR Georgia : Thomas Ambrose (TC), Katie Ferrington, Jeff Leininger, Hunter Leininger, Jeni Mcneal (TAC)
Team Bend Racing : Jason Magness (TC), Melissa Coombes, Stephen Thomas, Daniel Staudigel, Darren Steinbach (TAC)
Team Bones Adventure : Roy Malone (TC), Mari Chandlar, Charles Triponez, Jen Segger, David Egbert (TAC)
Team Canyoneros : HIen Nguyen (TC), Greg Watson, Nathan Whitaker, Lena Mcknight, Steven Geer (TAC)
Team Checkpoint Zero : Shane Hagerman (TC), Christopher Von Ins, Peter Jolles, Michele Hobson, Micheal Seroczynski (TAC)
Team Curl : Jennifer Hemmen (TC), Justin Smith, Brett Gravlin, Steven Lenhart, Jeff Failers (TAC)
Team Eagle Scouts : Eric Lillistorm (TC), Matthew Moniz, Katie Hancock, Corey Mullins, Charley Walton (TAC)
Team Endure : Travis Macy (TC), Mark Macy, Danelle Ballengee, Shane Sigle, Andrew Speers (TAC)
Team Flying J : Dianette Wells (TC), Guy LaRocque, Harald Zundel, Blain Reeves, Brian Johnson (TAC)
Team Iron Cowboy : Sonja Wieck (TC), James Lawrence, Shaun Christian, Aaron Hopkinson, Joe Morton (TAC)
Team Nika : Jeffery Bates (TC), Kara Haun, Ashley Andrews, John Bender, Keria Galan (TAC)
Team Onyx : Clifton Lyles (TC), Corree Aussem-Woltering, Samantha Scipio, Chirss Smith, Mikayla Lyless (TAC)
Team Out There : Mike Kloser (TC), Josiah Middaugh, Gretchen Reeves, Gordon Townsend, Neil Jones (TAC)
Team Peak Traverse : Ryan Opray (TC), Tim Cannard, Mikayla Wingle, Daniel Bussius, Stephen Morrow (TAC)
Team Regulators : Steven Bell (TC), Joshua Watkins, Heather Gustafson, Crista Jorgensen, Jason Hull (TAC)
Team Stray Dogs : Marshall Ulrich (TC), Adrian Crane, Bob Haugh, Nancy Bristow, Heather Ulrich (TAC)
Team Strong Machine: Cliff White (TC), Kate White, Starker White, Michael Garrison, John McInnes (TAC)
Team Sundance Kids : Chase McMillian (TC), Scott Ward, Sylvia Greer, Aaron Smith, Jason Serman (TAC)
Team Super Fighters : Heather Flebb (TC), Cary Flebbe, Sean Martin, Micheal Nicolaides, Danny Trudeau (TAC)
Team Unbroken : Hal Riley (TC), Gretchen Evans, Dr. Anne Bailey, Keith Mitchell Knoop, Cale Yarborough (TAC)
Team US Military : Joshua Forester (TC), Caitlin Thorn, Jesse Tubb, Jesse Sprangler, Kevin Howser (TAC)

Uruguay
Team Chips Adventure : Nicolas Davyt (TC), Luis Enrique Gomez, David Vega, Alejandra Isabella, Ernesto Parra (TAC) 
Team Uruguay Natural : Ruben Mandure (TC), Fredrica Frontini, Gonzalo Smaldone, Thiago Bonini, Laura Moratorio (TAC)

Final standings

Teams that did not finish
The following 22 teams failed to finish for a variety of reasons:

References

External links
 

2020s American reality television series
2020 American television series debuts
2020 American television series endings
Reality competition television series
Adventure reality television series
Amazon Prime Video original programming
English-language television shows
Television series created by Mark Burnett
Television series by Amazon Studios
Television shows filmed in Fiji
Television shows set in Fiji